AT85 Pro Cycling was a British UCI Continental cycling team founded in 2017 by sports director Tim Elverson. The team folded on 17 March 2023.

Team History
The team formed as Bike Channel–Canyon in 2017. On 1 January 2018, the team announced that Eisberg had stepped up its sponsorship in order to allow the team to function after Bike Channel went into administration.

The team has enjoyed two hugely successful seasons. Some of the highlights of their 2018 campaign include: Harry Tanfield winning stage one of the Tour de Yorkshire, which led to him being signed by World Tour team . The team won the overall title in the Tour Series the UK's premier circuit racing championship. Charlie Tanfield became a world champion in the UCI Track Cycling World Championships team pursuit and won a gold medal in the individual pursuit at the Commonwealth Games. He was also crowned British under-23-time trial champion on the road. Ryan Christensen, Max Stedman, and Charlie Tanfield were selected to race at the under-23 UCI Road World Championships in Austria, the latter in the time trial. At the Tour of Britain, the team recorded three top-10 stage finishes, Max Stedman was 20th in the general classification and Alex Paton won the Eisberg sprints jersey.

2019 was another successful year for the team with multiple podiums in the UK and Europe. Some highlights included winning the Tour Series overall title for a second year running, a top 10 in the Tour de Yorkshire and the Tour of Britain, as well as the Eisberg sprints jersey at the Tour of Britain for the second time.

In December 2020, Elverson announced that the team had acquired sponsorship from British sunglasses maker SunGod and that the team's name for the 2021 racing season would become Canyon dhb SunGod.

Team roster

Major results
2017
Overall Tour of Quanzhou Bay, Max Stedman
Stage 1, Harry Tanfield
Stage 2, Max Stedman

2018
Stage 1 Tour de Yorkshire, Harry Tanfield
Overall Tour of Quanzhou Bay, Max Stedman
Stage 2, Max Stedman
Eisberg Sprints Jersey Winner Tour of Britain, Alex Paton

2019
 Arno Wallaard Memorial, Alexandar Richardson
 Stage 3 Tour de la Mirabelle, Daniel Pearson
 Stage 4 Tour de la Mirabelle, Alexandar Richardson
 Sprints classification Tour of Britain, Rory Townsend
 Stages 2 & 4 Tour of Fuzhou, Rory Townsend

2020
 Tour of Antalya, Max Stedman

2021
 Stage 1 Tour de la Mirabelle, Rory Townsend

2022
 Stage 1b Olympia's Tour, Matthew Gibson
 Stage 4 Olympia's Tour, Jim Brown
  Overall Tour de la Mirabelle, Robert Scott
 Stage 3, Robert Scott
 Stage 4, Matthew Bostock
 Paris–Troyes, Robert Scott
  National Road Race Championships, Rory Townsend

National, continental, world and Olympic champions
2018
 British U23 Time Trial, Charlie Tanfield
  Team pursuit, UCI Track World Championships Charlie Tanfield
 Commonwealth Games
 Individual pursuit Charlie Tanfield

References

External links

Cycling teams based in the United Kingdom
UCI Continental Teams (Europe)
Cycling teams established in 2017
2017 establishments in the United Kingdom